Orson Hyde (January 8, 1805 – November 28, 1878) was a leader in the early Latter Day Saint movement and a member of the first Quorum of the Twelve Apostles. He was the President of the Quorum of the Twelve Apostles of the Church of Jesus Christ of Latter-day Saints (LDS Church) from 1847 to 1875 and was a missionary of the LDS Church in the United States, Europe, and the Ottoman Empire.

Early life
Hyde was born on January 8, 1805, to Nathan Hyde and Sally Thorpe in Oxford, Connecticut. His father served in the War of 1812. His mother died when he was seven years old, and Hyde and his eleven siblings were "scattered among several foster parents". He was raised in nearby Derby, Connecticut, under the care of Nathan Wheeler. When he was 14 years of age, Hyde walked from Connecticut to Kirtland, Ohio, to move there with Wheeler. He was employed as a retail clerk in Kirtland. Hyde became involved with the local Methodist church in 1827, and then joined the Reformed Baptist Society, also called the Campbellites, through the preaching of Sidney Rigdon. He was a Campbellite pastor in Mentor, Ohio, in 1830.

Church membership and service
When Oliver Cowdery and other Latter Day Saint missionaries preached in Kirtland in late 1830, Hyde spoke publicly against the Book of Mormon. However, when his former minister, Sidney Rigdon, joined the Latter Day Saint church, Hyde investigated the claims of the missionaries and was baptized by Rigdon in October of 1831. Rigdon and Joseph Smith ordained him as an elder later that month, and Oliver Cowdery ordained him as a high priest on October 26. Hyde was called on a succession of missions for the church, serving with Hyrum Smith, Samuel H. Smith, and John Gould. In 1832, he was among the first missionaries in Connecticut. He was also among the first missionaries from the church to preach in Maine and Massachusetts. During one mission trip, Hyde traveled about 2,000 miles on foot between New York, Rhode Island, Massachusetts, and Maine. He discussed his new faith with his old Campbellite acquaintances during these missions.

Hyde was present for the founding of the School of the Prophets in 1833. He then marched with Zion's Camp in 1834 and became one of the members of the first presiding high council in Kirtland, Ohio. He was ordained an apostle of the church on February 15, 1835, as one of the original Quorum of the Twelve, being fifth in seniority. David Whitmer, Oliver Cowdery, and Martin Harris performed Hyde's ordination. After becoming an apostle, Hyde served additional missions to Vermont, New Hampshire, New York, and Canada. He also embarked on a mission with Heber C. Kimball to Great Britain in 1837, returning home in 1838. Their efforts were successful in bringing approximately 1,500 converts to the faith.

Upon returning from Britain, Hyde found the church in a period of persecution and internal dissension. He wrote that he felt God was no longer with the church. He left the church on October 19, 1838, with Thomas B. Marsh, the presiding member of the Twelve. Marsh explained the reasons for their dissent in an affidavit which he and Hyde signed on October 24, 1838, in Richmond, Missouri. The reasons they provided included their contention that the Mormons had organized into a company known as the Danites, "who have taken an oath to support the heads of the church in all things that they say or do, whether right or wrong" and that Mormon and Danite vigilantes had burned and looted non-Mormon settlements in Daviess County. Marsh and Hyde also claimed that Joseph Smith planned "to take the State, & he professes to his people to intend taking the U.S. & ultimately the whole world."

The testimony of Marsh and Hyde added to the panic in northwestern Missouri and contributed to the subsequent 1838 Mormon War. Because a Mormon attack was believed to be imminent, a unit of the state militia from Ray County was dispatched to patrol the border between Ray and Caldwell County, where the Mormons resided. On October 25, 1838, reports reached Mormons in Far West that this state militia unit was a "mob" and had kidnapped several Mormons. The Mormons formed an armed rescue party and attacked the militia in what became known as the Battle of Crooked River. Although only one non-Mormon was killed on the Missourian side, initial reports held that half the unit had been wiped out. The Mormons suffered more casualties. This attack on the state militia, coupled with the earlier expulsion of non-Mormons from Daviess County led Missouri's governor to respond with force. On October 27, he called out 2,500 state militia to put down what he perceived as a Mormon rebellion and signed Missouri Executive Order 44, which became known as the "Extermination Order".

Because he had signed the Richmond affidavit with Marsh, Hyde was disfellowshipped (disciplined, but not removed from membership) in 1838. On May 4, 1839, he was removed from the Quorum of the Twelve Apostles. The leadership of the church invited Hyde and William Smith to explain their actions. On June 27, Hyde returned to the church and publicly explained himself, recanting his affidavit and asking to be restored. He was readmitted into the Quorum on June 27, 1839, in Nauvoo, Illinois.

Mission to Jerusalem
Orson Hyde had a vision in March 1840 in which the Spirit told him he was to visit the cities of London, Amsterdam, Constantinople, and Jerusalem, and that in Jerusalem he was to declare to those of Judah that they must "gather together", "assemble yourselves", and "go into the defenced cities". This Hyde did with a prayer on October 24, 1841, in which he dedicated the land of Palestine for the return of the Jews.

Originally, he was supposed to travel with John E. Page, but Page "failed to accompany him". According to the minutes of the meeting on April 6, 1840, at which Hyde was dispatched, he was "to visit the cities of London, Amsterdam, Constantinople, and Jerusalem; and also other places that he may deem expedient; and converse with the priests, rulers, and elders of the Jews, and obtain from them all the information possible, and communicate the same to some principal paper for publication, that it may have a general circulation throughout the United States." His letter of introduction claimed that "The Jewish nations have been scattered abroad among the Gentiles for a long period; and in our estimation, the time of the commencement of their return to the Holy Land has already arrived." He left the United States and traveled through Germany, the Ottoman Empire, and Egypt before arriving in Jerusalem. He stayed in Bavaria for a while to learn the German language.

Hyde stayed in Jerusalem from April 1841 to December 1842. He recorded that before dawn on October 24, 1841, he climbed up the Mount of Olives overlooking the city, then both wrote and recited a prayer, part of which reads:

Now, O Lord! Thy servant has been obedient to the heavenly vision which Thou gavest him in his native land; and under the shadow of Thine outstretched arm, he has safely arrived in this place to dedicate and consecrate this land unto Thee, for the gathering together of Judah's scattered remnants, according to the predictions of the holy Prophets -- for the building up of Jerusalem again after it has been trodden down by the Gentiles so long, and for rearing a Temple in honor of Thy name. Everlasting thanks be ascribed unto Thee, O Father, Lord of heaven and earth, that Thou hast preserved Thy servant from the dangers of the seas, and from the plague and pestilence which have caused the land to mourn. The violence of man has also been restrained, and Thy providential care by night and by day has been exercised over Thine unworthy servant. Accept, therefore, O Lord, the tribute of a grateful heart for all past favors, and be pleased to continue Thy kindness and mercy towards a needy worm of the dust.

Having dedicated Jerusalem and Palestine for the ingathering of the Jews, Hyde departed the mountain after building a small altar with stones. The Orson Hyde Memorial Garden on the Mount was dedicated in 1979. The park was funded by donations to the Orson Hyde Foundation through the Jerusalem Foundation. Hyde traveled home through Europe, stopping in Germany to produce the first LDS Church pamphlets in German.

Family life

Hyde married Marinda Nancy Johnson, in Kirtland, Ohio, on September 4, 1834. Joseph Smith was sealed to Marinda as a plural wife either in April of 1842, or in May of 1843. Marinda signed an affidavit saying that her sealing to Joseph Smith occurred in May 1843. However, one of Smith's scribes, Thomas Bullock, later wrote a list of plural marriage dates in the back of one of Smith's journals and noted a sealing date of April 1842. It is not clear when or if Hyde learned about his wife's sealing to Smith, however, John D. Lee, in his book Mormonism Unveiled, reported that Hyde may have given his consent. Three months after his return from his mission, Hyde learned about plural marriage and married two additional wives. He ultimately took eight wives and fathered 32 children. He and Johnson divorced in 1870.

Later life
After Joseph Smith's death in 1844, the majority of the Latter Day Saints left Nauvoo for Iowa Territory. Hyde, however, remained behind to oversee the completion of the Nauvoo Temple, which was dedicated in 1846. He served on the Nauvoo City Council from 1843 to 1845 and joined the Council of Fifty on March 13, 1844. He then returned to England, presiding over the British mission from 1846 to 1847. During this trip, he also served as editor of the Millennial Star, the Latter-day Saint publication in England. Upon his return to the United States, he became President of the Quorum of the Twelve in 1847. Hyde was placed in charge of the church in the Midwest, remaining in Council Bluffs, Iowa, until 1852. He published the Frontier Guardian in Council Bluffs. He then moved to Utah Territory in 1852.

Hyde represented Utah as an associate judge for the U.S. Supreme Court beginning in 1852. During the settlement of Utah Territory, Brigham Young called Hyde to lead settlement groups to Carson Valley, Nevada, and the Sanpete–Sevier District in Utah. He also led an expedition to the Green River in 1853. Hyde was a member of the Manti Temple Building Committee and the Utah Territorial Assembly until he was sent to settle Spring City, Utah.

When dealing with the question of seniority in the council in 1875, long after the death of Joseph Smith, Brigham Young ruled that, if a council member had been disciplined and removed from the council, his seniority was based on the date of readmission. By this ruling, in June 1875, both Hyde and Apostle Orson Pratt were moved down in quorum seniority. So, when Hyde repented in 1839, he effectively joined the quorum as a new member. As a result of this ruling, John Taylor replaced Hyde as President of the Quorum of the Twelve Apostles in 1875.

Death and legacy
Hyde died in Spring City on November 28, 1878, one day after suffering a severe stroke. He was 72 years old. He was succeeded by Moses Thatcher in the Quorum of the Twelve Apostles. He is buried at Spring City. Hyde is mentioned by name in six sections of the Doctrine and Covenants: sections 68, 75, 100, 102, 103, and 124. In his Latter-day Saint Biographical Encyclopedia, Andrew Jenson describes Hyde as "a man of great natural ability, and by industrious application had acquired a good education, which, with his great and varied experience and extended travels, rendered him a powerful instrument in the hands of God for the defense and dissemination of the gospel and the building up of the Latter-day Work."

Notes

References
.
.
.
Document Containing the Correspondence, Orders &c. in Relation to the Disturbances with the Mormons; And the Evidence Given Before the Hon. Austin A. King, Judge of the Fifth Judicial Circuit of the State of Missouri, at the Court-House in Richmond, in a Criminal Court of Inquiry, Begun November 12, 1838, on the Trial of Joseph Smith, Jr., and Others, for High Treason and Other Crimes Against the State. Fayette, Missouri, 1841, complete text. 
Ludlow, Daniel H., A Companion to Your Study of the Doctrine and Covenants, Deseret Book Co., Salt Lake City, UT, 1978. .
Ludlow, Daniel H., Editor. Church History, Selections From the Encyclopedia of Mormonism.  Deseret Book Co., Salt Lake City, UT, 1992. .
 
 For information on his experience in Jerusalem see his letter is reprinted in chapter 26 of volume 4 of History of the Church, under the subtitle "Elder Orson Hyde's Letter -- His Prayer of Dedication on the Mount of Olives." For a separate account see Michael Oren, Power, Faith and Fantasy.  New York, W.W. Norton, 2007. P. 142.  See also Greenberg pp. 238–239.

Further reading
Orson Hyde, A Voice from Jerusalem (Liverpool: P.P. Pratt, 1842) — Hyde's account of his mission to Germany, Constantinople, and Jerusalem

External links

Grampa Bill's G.A. Pages: Orson Hyde 
List of Hyde's speeches (Wikisource)
 Orson Hyde autobiography and funeral, MSS 444 at L. Tom Perry Special Collections, Harold B. Lee Library, Brigham Young University
Orson Hyde letter, MSS SC 2959 at L. Tom Perry Special Collections, Harold B. Lee Library, Brigham Young University
Orson Hyde letter to Ann Eliza Hyde, MSS 357 at L. Tom Perry Special Collections, Harold B. Lee Library, Brigham Young University
William E. McLellin and Orson Hyde meeting minutes of the Quorum of the Twelve Apostles, MSS 3900 at L. Tom Perry Special Collections, Harold B. Lee Library, Brigham Young University

1805 births
1838 Mormon War
1878 deaths
19th-century Mormon missionaries
American Mormon missionaries in Germany
American Mormon missionaries in Palestine (region)
American Mormon missionaries in Scotland
American Mormon missionaries in the Netherlands
American Mormon missionaries in the United States
American expatriates in the Ottoman Empire
American general authorities (LDS Church)
Apostles (LDS Church)
Apostles of the Church of Christ (Latter Day Saints)
Converts to Mormonism from Restoration Movement denominations
Doctrine and Covenants people
Latter Day Saints from Iowa
Mormon missionaries in the Ottoman Empire
Mormon pioneers
People from Derby, Connecticut
People from Oxford, Connecticut
People from Sanpete County, Utah
Presidents of the Quorum of the Twelve Apostles (LDS Church)
Religious leaders from Connecticut
Harold B. Lee Library-related 19th century articles